Haviland is a city in Kiowa County, Kansas, United States.  As of the 2020 census, the population of the city was 678.  It is home of Barclay College and known for meteorite finds connected to the Haviland Crater and for an annual meteorite festival held in July.

History
Haviland was founded by a group of Quakers originally from Indiana and named for Laura Haviland, a leader of the Underground Railroad.

The first post office in Haviland was established in June 1886. Haviland was incorporated as a city in 1906.

Geography
Haviland is located at  (37.616685, -99.105478).

Demographics

2010 census
As of the census of 2010, there were 701 people, 228 households, and 162 families residing in the city. The racial makeup of the city was 96.1% White, 1.1% African American, 1.7% Native American, 0.6% Asian, 0.1% Pacific Islander, 0.1% from other races, and 0.1% from two or more races. Hispanic or Latino of any race were 3.6% of the population.

There were 228 households, of which 28.1% had children under the age of 18 living with them, 62.7% were married couples living together, 7.5% had a female householder with no husband present, 0.9% had a male householder with no wife present, and 28.9% were non-families. 25.9% of all households were made up of individuals, and 12.2% had someone living alone who was 65 years of age or older. The average household size was 2.43 and the average family size was 2.93.

The median age in the city was 32.8 years. 19.4% of residents were under the age of 18; 21.9% were between the ages of 18 and 24; 20.3% were from 25 to 44; 22.5% were from 45 to 64; and 15.8% were 65 years of age or older. The gender makeup of the city was 46.9% male and 53.1% female.

2000 census
As of the census of 2000, there were 612 people, 207 households, and 146 families residing in the city. The racial makeup of the city was 96.24% White, 1.14% African American, 0.82% Native American, 0.49% Asian, 0.98% from other races, and 0.33% from two or more races. Hispanic or Latino of any race were 3.43% of the population.

There were 207 households, out of which 32.4% had children under the age of 18 living with them, 58.9% were married couples living together, 8.7% had a female householder with no husband present, and 29.0% were non-families. 27.5% of all households were made up of individuals, and 8.2% had someone living alone who was 65 years of age or older. The average household size was 2.51 and the average family size was 3.08.

In the city, the population was spread out, with 25.2% under the age of 18, 17.8% from 18 to 24, 19.4% from 25 to 44, 22.4% from 45 to 64, and 15.2% who were 65 years of age or older. The median age was 33 years. For every 100 females, there were 91.8 males. For every 100 females age 18 and over, there were 91.6 males.

The median income for a household in the city was $29,821, and the median income for a family was $36,250. Males had a median income of $30,179 versus $18,214 for females. The per capita income for the city was $12,075. About 6.6% of families and 11.2% of the population were below the poverty line, including 14.4% of those under age 18 and 8.3% of those age 65 or over.

Education

Primary and secondary
Haviland is served by USD 474 Haviland. The district shares Kiowa County High School with USD 422 Kiowa County Schools.

Haviland High School was closed through school unification. The Haviland Dragons won the Kansas State High School boys Track & Field championship in 1922.

College
Barclay College, a four-year private college affiliated with the Religious Society of Friends, is located in Haviland.

See also
 Barclay College
 Haviland Crater and Brenham (meteorite)

References

Further reading

External links
 City of Haviland
 Haviland - Directory of Public Officials
 USD 474, local school district
 Haviland city map, KDOT

Cities in Kansas
Cities in Kiowa County, Kansas